Przybyszewski Island is an ice-covered island  long in the Marshall Archipelago. The island was charted from aircraft of the USS Glacier under Captain Edwin A. McDonald, U.S. Navy, in 1962. Named by him for Lieutenant (j.g.) V. A. Przybyszewski, U.S. Navy Reserve, helicopter pilot on the Glacier who sighted the island from the air on January 26, 1962. The name has been misspelled "Prezbecheski Island" on certain maps and charts.

See also 
 List of Antarctic and sub-Antarctic islands

Islands of Marie Byrd Land